Moonwalk is Taiwanese Mandopop trio boyband JPM's first studio Mandarin album. It was first released on 26 August 2011 by Sony Music (Taiwan). On January 25, 2013, JPM released a Japanese version of the album. It consists of Normal Edition and First Press Limited Edition, which comes with a bonus DVD containing five music videos, one-hour music special, and interview footage.

Album
Their single "Moonwalk" features a million-dollar music video in which the boys perform a spectacular "space dance" tailor-made for them by famous Taiwan dance choreographer Terry Lin.  Aside from the music video, JPM members also contributed with the making of their album as Liao Xiao Jie filled the role of the producer for part of the album, while Qiu Wang Zi is the lyricist of three songs and composer of two songs in the album. In addition with the ten songs listed, the album also includes a Cantonese version of "因為有你" (Because of You). On August 29, three days after its release, the album sales reached more than 50,000 copies.

Track listing

Music videos
 "月球漫步"  (Moonwalk) 
 "那不是雪中紅"  (This is not Rose in Snow)
 ""因為有你" (Because of You)
 "平凡的美麗"
 "Never Give Up"

References

External links
  JPM page at Sony Music
 

JPM (band) albums
Sony Music Taiwan albums
2011 debut albums